Padalda also known as Padalde Bk. is a small village in Shahada Taluka of Nandurbar district, Maharashtra, India. Padalda is known for the Shree Murali Manohar Temple.

Demographics
Padalda has a population of around 10,000, of which 90% is in agriculture and 10% in small business. Padalda is a spiritually bounded village and a holy place to visit. It has 4 temples around the village. Among which the most visited temple is the Murali Manohar Temple.

Economy
Most of the population in the village is dependent upon agriculture and allied fields. The crops cultivated here include Wheat, Cotton, Sugarcane, Sunflower, Jowar, Bajra, Toor dal, Chickpea, Amaranth, Banana, Water melon, Musk melon, Sesame,Banana

References 

Villages in Nandurbar district